Good Time Charlie

Good Time Charlie, song by Bobby Bland
Good Time Charlie, country album by Charlie McCoy
"Good Time Charlie", song by Gasolin from Gas 5
"Good Time Charlie", song by Priests from The Seduction of Kansas
Good Time Charlie, a term used for the flamboyant life style of U.S. Representative Charlie Wilson.